The Turkey national beach handball team is the national team of Turkey. It is governed by the Turkey Handball Federation and takes part in international beach handball competitions.

Results
They finished second at the 2013 European Championship, in Randers, Denmark, losing the final with Hungary and received silver medal.

World Championships

World Games

See also
Turkey women's national beach handball team

References

External links
Official website
IHF profile

Beach handball
National beach handball teams
National beach